Heliopolis (Jwnw, Iunu or 𓉺𓏌𓊖; ,  'the Pillars';) was a major city of ancient Egypt. It was the capital of the 13th or Heliopolite Nome of Lower Egypt and a major religious centre. It is now located in Ayn Shams, a northeastern district of Cairo.

Heliopolis was one of the oldest cities of ancient Egypt, occupied since the Predynastic Period. It greatly expanded under the Old and Middle Kingdoms but is today mostly destroyed, its temples and other buildings having been scavenged for the construction of medieval Cairo. Most information about the ancient city comes from surviving records.

The major surviving remnant of Heliopolis is the obelisk of the Temple of Ra-Atum erected by Senusret I of Dynasty XII. It still stands in its original position, now within Al-Masalla in Al-Matariyyah, Cairo. The Romans took the Obelisk of Montecitorio to the city to Rome, under Augustus, where it remains. The two smaller obelisks called Cleopatra's Needle, in London and New York, also came from the city.

Names

Heliopolis is the Latinised form of the Greek name Hēlioúpolis, meaning "City of the Sun". Helios, the personified and deified form of the sun, was identified by the Greeks with the native Egyptian gods Ra and Atum, whose principal cult was located in the city.

Its traditional Egyptological transcription is Iunu but it appears in biblical Hebrew as ʾŌn, and ʾĀwen leading some scholars to reconstruct its pronunciation in earlier Egyptian as *ʔa:wnu, perhaps from older /ja:wunaw/. Variant transcriptions include Awnu and Annu. The name survived as Coptic  ŌN.

The city also appears in the Old Kingdom Pyramid Texts as the "House of Ra".

History

Ancient

In ancient Egypt, Heliopolis was a regional center from predynastic times.

It was principally notable as the cult center of the sun god Atum, who came to be identified with Ra and then Horus. Its priests maintained that Atum or Ra was the first being, rising self-created from the primeval waters. A decline in the importance of Ra's cult during Dynasty V led to the development of the Ennead, a grouping of nine major Egyptian deities that placed the others in subordinate status to Ra–Atum. The high priests of Ra are not as well documented as those of other deities, although the high priests of Dynasty VI (BC) have been discovered and excavated. 

During the Amarna Period of Dynasty XVIII, Pharaoh Akhenaten introduced a kind of henotheistic worship of Aten, the deified solar disc. As part of his construction projects, he built a Heliopolitan temple named "Elevating Aten" ( or Wetjes Aten), whose stones can still be seen in some of the gates of Cairo's medieval city wall. The cult of the Mnevis bull, another embodiment of the Sun, had its altar here as well. The bulls' formal burial ground was situated north of the city.

The store-city Pithom is mentioned once in the Hebrew Bible (Exodus 1:11), and according to one theory, this was Heliopolis.

Hellenistic
Alexander the Great, on his march from Pelusium to Memphis, halted at this city.

The temple of Ra was said to have been, to a special degree, a depository for royal records, and Herodotus states that the priests of Heliopolis were the best informed in matters of history of all the Egyptians. Heliopolis flourished as a seat of learning during the Greek period; the schools of philosophy and astronomy are claimed to have been frequented by Orpheus, Homer,  Pythagoras, Plato, Solon, and other Greek philosophers. Ichonuphys was lecturing there in 308 BC, and the Greek mathematician Eudoxus, who was one of his pupils, learned from him the true length of the year and month, upon which he formed his octaeterid, or period of 8 years or 99 months. Ptolemy II had Manetho, the chief priest of Heliopolis, collect his history of the ancient kings of Egypt from its archives. The later Greek rulers, the Ptolemies, probably took little interest in their "father" Ra as Greeks were never much of sun worshipers and the Ptolemies favored the cult of Serapis, and Alexandria had eclipsed the learning of Heliopolis; thus with the withdrawal of royal favour Heliopolis quickly dwindled, and the students of native lore deserted it for other temples supported by a wealthy population of pious citizens. By the first century BC, in fact, Strabo found the temples deserted, and the town itself almost uninhabited, although priests were still present.

Heliopolis was well known to the ancient Greeks and Romans, being noted by most major geographers of the period, including Ptolemy, Herodotus, and others, down to the Byzantine geographer Stephanus of Byzantium.

Roman
In Roman Egypt, Heliopolis belonged to the province Augustamnica, causing it to appear as  when it needed to be distinguished from Roman Heliopolis. Its population probably contained a considerable Arabian element. Many of the city's obelisks were removed to adorn more northern cities of the Delta and Rome. Two of these eventually became London's Cleopatra's Needle and its twin in New York's Central Park.

Islamic
During the Middle Ages, the growth of Fustat and Cairo only a few kilometres away caused its ruins to be massively scavenged for building materials, including for their city walls. The site became known as the "Eye of the Sun" (Ayn Shams) and ʻArab al-Ḥiṣn.

Legacy
The importance of the solar cult at Heliopolis is reflected in both ancient pagan and current monotheistic beliefs. Greco-Roman mythology held that the Egyptian bennu, renamed phoenix, brought the remains of its predecessor to the altar of the sun god at Heliopolis each time it was reborn. In the Hebrew's scriptures, Heliopolis is referenced directly and obliquely, usually in reference to its prominent pagan cult. In his prophesies against Egypt, Isaiah claimed the "City of the Sun" (Ir ha Shemesh) would be one of the five Egyptian cities to follow the Lord of Heaven's army and speak Hebrew. Jeremiah and Ezekiel mention the "House of the Sun" (Beth Shemesh) and Ôn, claiming Nebuchadnezzar of Babylon would shatter its obelisks and burn its temple and that its "young men of Folly" (Aven) would "fall by the sword".

The "Syrian Heliopolis" Baalbek has been claimed to have gained its solar cult from a priest colony emigrating from Egypt.

Heliopolis in Augustamnica remains a titular see of both the Roman Catholic Church and the Eastern Orthodox Church.

Present site

Some ancient city walls of crude brick can be seen in the fields, a few granite blocks bearing the name of Ramesses II remain, and the position of the great Temple of Ra-Atum is marked by the Al-Masalla obelisk. Archaeologists excavated some of its tombs in 2004. In 2017, parts of a colossal statue of Psamtik I were found and excavated.

Gallery
A selection of old maps showing Heliopolis are below:

See also

List of ancient Egyptian towns and cities
Other Heliopolises, particularly
 Heliopolis, the 20th-century suburb of Cairo
 Ilioupoli, the 20th-century suburb of Athens settled by Egyptian Greeks
Ancient Egyptian creation myths – in reference to the religious belief system of Iunu at Heliopolis
List of Egyptian dynasties – in reference to the reigns centered at Heliopolis
Benben

Notes

References

Citations

Bibliography
 Allen, James P. 2001. "Heliopolis". In The Oxford Encyclopedia of Ancient Egypt, edited by Donald Bruce Redford. Vol. 2 of 3 vols. Oxford, New York, and Cairo: Oxford University Press and The American University in Cairo Press. 88–89
 Bilolo, Mubabinge. 1986. Les cosmo-théologies philosophiques d'Héliopolis et d'Hermopolis. Essai de thématisation et de systématisation, (Academy of African Thought, Sect. I, vol. 2),  Kinshasa–Munich 1987;  new ed., Munich-Paris, 2004.
 Reallexikon der Ägyptischen Religionsgeschichte - Hans Bonnet 
 Collier, Mark and Manley, Bill. How to Read Egyptian Hieroglyphs: Revised Edition. Berkeley: University of California Press, 1998.
 The Routledge Dictionary of Egyptian Gods and Goddesses, George Hart 
 Redford, Donald Bruce. 1992. "Heliopolis". In The Anchor Bible Dictionary, edited by David Noel Freedman. Vol. 3 of 6 vols. New York: Doubleday. 122–123

External links
Obelisk of Psametik II from Heliopolis, removed and  reerected by Augustus in Rome

Cities in ancient Egypt
Roman sites in Egypt
Archaeological sites in Egypt
Former populated places in Egypt
Hebrew Bible cities
Nile Delta
History of Cairo
Tells (archaeology)